Fărcașele is a commune in Olt County, Oltenia, Romania. It is composed of four villages: Fărcașele, Fărcașu de Jos, Ghimpați and Hotărani.

References

Communes in Olt County
Localities in Oltenia